Heartstrings is a 1923 British silent romance film directed by Edwin Greenwood and starring Gertrude McCoy, Victor McLaglen and Russell Thorndike. It is an adaptation of the 1858 short story The Manchester Marriage by Elizabeth Gaskell.

Cast
 Gertrude McCoy as Norah
 Victor McLaglen as Frank Wilson
 Edith Bishop as Alice Wilson
 Russell Thorndike as Tom Openshaw
 Sydney Fairbrother as Mrs. Chadwick
 George Bishop as Mr. Chadwick
 Kate Gurney as Mrs. Wilson

References

Bibliography
 Goble, Alan. The Complete Index to Literary Sources in Film. Walter de Gruyter, 1999.

External links

1923 films
1920s romance films
British romance films
Films directed by Edwin Greenwood
British silent feature films
Films set in England
British black-and-white films
1920s English-language films
1920s British films
English-language romance films